Qasr-e Yaqub (also romanized as Qaşr-e Ya‘qūb and Qasr-i-Yā‘qūb; also known as Qaşr-e Qal‘eh Ya‘qūb) is a village in Khorrami Rural District, in the Central District of Khorrambid County, Fars Province, Iran. At the 2006 census, its population was 334, in 83 families.

References 

Populated places in Khorrambid County